Kappa Delta Kappa Sorority, also known as KDK, was created on November 22, 1938, at Ursinus College in Collegeville, PA.  It is one of five sororities currently active at Ursinus. It is a sisterhood of women who promote friendship, scholarship, and diversity within the Ursinus College community. The qualities that ΚΔΚ seeks in young women include achievement, integrity, responsibility, tolerance, empathy, respect, and self-reliance. Kappa Delta Kappa Sorority continually honors its commitment to community service, through toy and clothing drives, charity walks, and other assorted service activities.

Purpose 
"Kappa Delta Kappa sorority shall establish a social organization for the members thereof, to form a permanent society which will create a closer tie between the alumni and the undergraduate women, and to provide a group which will cooperate toward the advancement of Ursinus College."

History 
The first meeting of Kappa Delta Kappa was held on November 22, 1938, on the campus of Ursinus College in the South Hall dormitory (now Musser Hall).

Founders
 Claire Borrell - President
 Dorothy Cullen - Vice President
 Elizabeth Funk - Recording Secretary
 Jean Clawson - Treasurer
 Lucia Citta - Corresponding Secretary
 Blanche Schultz - Chaplain

Charter Members
 Dorothy Adams
 Helen Adams
 Norma Braker
 Edna Hesketh
 Roberta High
 Mary Hyde
 Dorothy Lees
 Janet MacNair
 Roberta Ostroske
 Kathryn Root
 Sarah Sadler
 Acquilla Settenbenz

References

External links
 Web site

Student societies in the United States